Eckol is a phlorotannin isolated from brown algae in the family Lessoniaceae such as species in the genus Ecklonia such as E. cava or E. kurome or in the genus Eisenia such as Eisenia bicyclis.

The molecule possesses a dibenzo-p-dioxin skeleton and a phloroglucinol component. The molecule can also be viewed as a phloroglucinol trimer.

It exhibits an antiplasmin inhibitory effect and a radioprotective effect in a mouse model. It also exhibits an in vitro cytoprotective effect against oxidative stress in Chinese hamster lung fibroblasts. It also shows antithrombotic and profibrinolytic activities.

References 

Phlorotannins
Dibenzodioxins